This is a list of all the crossings of the Neversink River from its mouth, the Delaware River at Port Jervis, New York, to its source, the confluence of its east and west branches near the hamlet of Claryville

Crossings

Neversink River
Transportation in Orange County, New York
Neversink